Kudadhoo as a place name may refer to:
 Kudadhoo (Alif Dhaal Atoll) (Republic of Maldives)
 Kudadhoo (Baa Atoll) (Republic of Maldives)
 Kudadhoo (Lhaviyani Atoll) (Republic of Maldives)
 Kudadhoo (Thaa Atoll) (Republic of Maldives)